Gates of Darkness is a 2019 American-French horror film directed by Don E. Fauntleroy and starring Tobin Bell.

Plot
A dramatic mystery where a haunted teen endures a terrifying exorcism in the hopes of unlocking shocking secrets about the church and his family.

Cast
Mary Mouser as Michelle
Randy Shelly as Stephen Tade
Tobin Bell as Monsignor Canell
Adrienne Barbeau as Rosemary
Alisha Boe as Alexa O'Connor
John Savage as Joseph
Brandon Beemer as Father Dumal
Lesley-Anne Down as Sister Clare

References

External links
 

2010s French-language films
American horror films
Films about exorcism
English-language French films
French horror films
2019 horror films
Films directed by Don E. FauntLeRoy
2010s English-language films
2010s American films
2010s French films